Jack Mockler (1893 - 13 July 1957) was an Irish hurler who played for the Tipperary senior team.

Mockler joined the team during the 1906 championship and was a regular member of the starting fifteen until his retirement after the 1912 championship. During that time he won two All-Ireland medals and three Munster medals.

At club level Mockler won numerous county championship medals with Thurles Sarsfield's.

References

1893 births
1957 deaths
Thurles Sarsfields hurlers
Tipperary inter-county hurlers
All-Ireland Senior Hurling Championship winners